Terry Serio is an Australian actor, director, musician and singer-songwriter. He has played recurring roles in several television series, including Blue Heelers, Halifax f.p. Ocean Girl, All Saints, Young Lions, Home and Away and Janet King. He played the lead in the film Running on Empty. He won a Helpmann Award for Best Male Actor in a Supporting Role in a Musical for his performance in Keating!

References

External links

Australian male television actors
Australian male stage actors
Australian singer-songwriters
Living people
Year of birth missing (living people)